The Beauty Inside (lit. "Beauty Inside") is a 2015 South Korean romantic comedy film based on the 2012 American social film The Beauty Inside, about a man who wakes up every day in a different body, starring Han Hyo Joo. It is Baik's feature film debut, after a career directing commercials.

Plot
One fateful day, on his eighteenth birthday, Woo-jin wakes up to see a face and body that is not his own. He is very shocked and confused, he confronts his mother with his new appearance, and she is also shocked but tearfully accepts him for who he is. With the help of his mother (Mun Suk) and his best friend (Song-beck), Woo-jin is able to cope with his strange condition. Ever since this day Woo-jin, now a furniture designer, wakes up in a different body every day, regardless of age, gender and nationality. Sometimes he's a man, a woman, old, young, or even a foreigner. He can even speak different languages, depending on who he is for the day. He's the same person on the inside, but on the outside he's always someone new. Looking at a different face in the mirror every morning is hard for him to get used to.

Every morning Woo-jin records himself on his computer, letting himself know who he was that day. And every morning he has to accustom himself to the changes of being a different person. He has to adjust to his new body, eyesight, voice etc. After many years of changing into different people Woo-jin has devised a system where he has all sorts of clothes and shoes to fit any and every type of body type, and of course different types of toiletries depending on if he is male or female. He also has a phoropter in order to test his vision and a Brannock foot measuring device to measure his feet so that he can choose the right-sized shoes.

As a furniture designer Woo-jin is able to work in the privacy of his own home and to avoid others finding out his secret. He owns a furniture company named ALX that specializes on handcrafted furniture designed for each individual client. His best friend Song-beck works with him, taking care of sales and going to meet Woo-jin's clients in person.

One day, Woo-jin develops a crush on a woman named Yi-soo who works in a furniture store. He begins to visit her every day to see her and occasionally talk to her, but she doesn’t realize this because he comes in as someone else each day. He waits until the right day when he is someone handsome (Park Seo-Joon) to finally approach her and ask her out on a date. He succeeds in asking her out and wants to continue seeing her as the same person. As a result, he goes for several days without sleep in order to stay as the same person that first went out with Yi-soo. He inevitably fails to keep the same body due to sleep deprivation and decides to stop contacting Yi-soo because he does not want to reveal his secret to her. Woo-Jin becomes a temp where Yi-soo works and asks her to dinner.  She is hesitant but goes with the female Woo-Jin to his house where he tells her who she/he is. She is shocked and it takes her some time to comprehend and accept Woo-jin for who he is on the inside.

They remain together and devise a plan to reunite with each other every time Woo-jin transforms. Whenever Woo-jin grabs Yi-soo’s hand she’ll know that it’s him. Or at least that's the idea. Yi-soo, after some time starts having difficulty with their relationship. She never truly knows who Woo-jin is and has to fully trust that the stranger grabbing her hand is Woo-jin. People begin to gossip about Yi-soo, saying that she is always going out with different men. This pushes her to a breaking point where she relies on medication to be able to cope with her stress, anxiety, and insomnia. In order to help her, Woo-jin decides to disappear from her life. Time goes by but Yi-soo never stops loving Woo-jin and is determined to find him.

Woo-Jin finds out from his mother that his father had the same condition and that is why his father left them.

Yi-soo is able to find Woo-jin once again in a different country (the Czech Republic). She confesses to him that she still loves him and wants to spend her life with him. After this confession Woo-jin proposes to Yi-soo and she accepts.

Cast

Han Hyo-joo as Yi-soo
Yoo Yeon-seok as Woo-jin
Kim Dae-myung as Woo-jin
Do Ji-han as Woo-jin
Bae Sung-woo as Woo-jin
Chun Young-woon as Woo-jin
Park Shin-hye as Woo-jin
Lee Beom-soo as Woo-jin
Park Seo-joon as Woo-jin
Kim Sang-ho as Woo-jin
Chun Woo-hee as Woo-jin
Juri Ueno as Woo-jin
Lee Jae-joon as Woo-jin
Kim Min-jae as Woo-jin
Lee Hyun-woo as Woo-jin
Jo Dal-hwan as Woo-jin
Lee Jin-wook as Woo-jin
Hong Da-mi as Woo-jin
Seo Kang-joon as Woo-jin
Kim Hee-won as Woo-jin
Lee Dong-wook as Woo-jin
Go Ah-sung as Woo-jin
Kim Joo-hyuk as Woo-jin
Lee Dong-hwi as Sang-baek
Moon Sook as Woo-jin's mother
Lee Geung-young as Woo-jin's father
Lee Mi-do as Hong Eun-soo
Lee Seung-chan as Woo-jin
Kwon Gi-ha as Woo-jin
Choi Yong-min as Yi-soo's father
Lee Bom as Lounge girl
Shin Dong-mi as Department head
Kim Si-eun as Woo-jin's mother in the past
Kim Rok-kyeong as Woo-jin 52
Kim Gwang-seop as Woo-jin 86
Park Keun-rok as Woo-jin 44
Yoon-hwan as Woo-jin 19
Kim Yeon-hee as Woo-jin 39
Son Seong-chan as Woo-jin 77
Park Min-soo as Woo-jin 80
Jang Eui-soo as Woo-jin 106

International release
The Beauty Inside pre-sold its distribution rights at the Cannes Film Market to 11 Asian countries, including Japan, Hong Kong, Macau, Taiwan, Singapore, Malaysia, Indonesia, Brunei and the Philippines.

Well Go USA released the film theatrically on September 11, 2015, with a DVD and Blu-ray release set for February 2, 2016.

Box office 
The Beauty Inside earned a total gross of $14,291,242 USD from 2,057,896 total admissions. There was a total of 646 screenings for the film.

Critical response 
On the website Rotten Tomatoes, the film had an approval rating of 70% based on 10 reviews, with a weighted average of 5.7/10. Another media aggregator website, Metacritic, weighted the film with an average score of 48 out of 100, based on 5 critics. Katie Walsh from the Los Angeles Times writes, “It’s satisfying, charming and surprising - a film that keeps its supernatural elements grounded in reality, with the focus on the spirituality of true love.

Remake and adaptations

Film 
In January 2017, it was announced that Emilia Clarke had been cast as the female lead in an upcoming American remake of the film, with Scott Neustadter and Michael H. Weber writing the script.

Television series
 
In July 2018, it was announced that Seo Hyun-jin has been cast as the female lead in a Korean drama remake of the film, alongside Lee Min-ki.

Awards and nominations

References

 

South Korean romantic drama films
2010s Korean-language films
2010s South Korean films